Taras Shevchuk (born ) is a Ukrainian male track cyclist, representing Ukraine at international competitions. He competed at the 2016 UCI Track Cycling World Championships in the men's team pursuit and at the 2016 UEC European Track Championships in the scratch event.

References

1997 births
Living people
Ukrainian male cyclists
Ukrainian track cyclists
Place of birth missing (living people)